West Branch Area Junior/Senior High School is a small, rural, public high school located near the village of Morrisdale, Pennsylvania.  The high school serves students from most of north eastern Clearfield County, and West Keating Township in Clinton County. The school is part of the West Branch Area School District. The current school building was completed in 1964. An addition to the High School building was finished in 2005.

In 2013, enrollment at West Branch Area Junior Senior High School was reported as 549 pupils in 7th through 12th grades.

West Branch Area High School students may choose to attend Clearfield County Career and Technology Center for training in the construction and mechanical trades; Architectural Drafting & Design Technology; Allied Health Services; Cosmetology; and Culinary Arts & Food Management. The Central Intermediate Unit IU10 provides the District with a wide variety of services like specialized education for disabled students and hearing, speech and visual disability services and professional development for staff and faculty.

Extracurriculars
West Branch Area School District offers a variety of clubs, activities and sports. A new baseball field was built, but leased to a local little league team for 25 years which expires in 2036.

Marching band
The West Branch band has played in such cities as Philadelphia, Washington, DC, and Harrisburg. Most recently, the band goes to Disney World bi-yearly to play in the Fourth of July parade. The band wins many awards and helps to uphold the proud traditions and history of West Branch High School.

Athletics
West Branch's mascot is the Warrior. Their team motos are "Warrior Power" and "Warrior Pride". They participate in the PIAA District 6 with Single-A classification in all but wrestling and baseball, where they compete in Double-A. Noteworthy athletic achievements include four PIAA individual state champions in wrestling (Jerry White, Robert English, Justin Owens, & Jared Ricotta), winning a district championship in football in 1988, a district championship in baseball, a team district duals championship in wrestling, and other various conference championships. Former Warrior baseball players Ed Veres and John Prestash were selected in the Major League Baseball Draft straight out of high school. Larry Beightol, a former football player at West Branch, is an offensive line coach in the NFL, most recently working with the Detroit Lions. Wrestling State Champion Jared Ricotta, after starting four years for the Duquesne Dukes Division I Wrestling Team and capturing three Northeast Regional Titles was recruited by NASCAR's Hendrick Motorsports as a professional tire changer.

Starting in Fall 2010, West Branch and local school Philipsburg-Osceola School District agreed to a co-op boys soccer program. Any 9-12th grade boy wishing to play soccer now plays with the Philipsburg Soccer team.

Sports
The District funds:

Varsity

Boys
Baseball - AA
Basketball- AA
Cross Country - A
Football - A
Soccer - AA
Track and Field - AA
Wrestling	- AA

Girls
Basketball - A
Cross Country - A
Soccer (Fall) - A
Softball - A
Track and Field - AA
Volleyball - A

Junior High Middle School Sports

Boys
Basketball
Football
Wrestling	

Girls
Basketball
Softball

According to PIAA directory July 2014

References

Public high schools in Pennsylvania
1964 establishments in Pennsylvania
Education in Clinton County, Pennsylvania
Schools in Clearfield County, Pennsylvania